Bad Hönningen is a municipality in the district of Neuwied, in Rhineland-Palatinate, Germany. It is situated on the right bank of the Rhine, approx. 15 km (10 mi) northwest of Neuwied, and 30 km (20 mi) southeast of Bonn.

Bad Hönningen is the seat of the Verbandsgemeinde ("collective municipality") Bad Hönningen.
The town contains three other districts called Ariendorf, Girgenrath and Reidenbruch.

History

Archeological findings suggest that the first settlers lived here over 1800 years ago when the Romans occupied the Rhineland.

The limes ran between Bad Hönningen and Rheinbrohl, opposite the Vinxtbach, the border between Germania Inferior and Superior. At this point the limes crossed the Rhine and continued on the eastern bank. On this site a small castellum was built. In 1972 a Roman watchtower was reconstructed from archeological finds.

In 1019, the town was documentary mentioned as "Besitztum Hohingen" for the first time.

During Thirty Years' War in 1632 Bad Hönningen burned down except twelve houses.

The first bathhouse for medical treatment opened in 1895.
Because of this, the town is legitimated to have the title "Bad" since 1950.

On July 12, 1969, it was granted the privileges of a town.

Population development
The data 1871-1987 comes from census results.
1782: 1.398
1871: 1.794
1939: 4.312
1970: 5.732
1987: 5.454
2005: 5.733

Castle
The castle in Bad Hönningen is called Schloss Arenfels and was built in 1258/59 by "Gerlach von Isenburg".

During its history, the architectural style converted several times.

In 1848, it was changed by its new owner "Ludolf Friedrich von Westerholt" into a neo-gothic castle.

Partner Town
 Saint Pierre lès Nemours (France) since 1980.

Sights
 Castles:
"Schloss Arenfels" in Bad Hönningen
"Burg Ariendorf" in Ariendorf (built 1840, neo-gothic)
 The "Hohe Haus" which was built in 1438 by the archbishop Raban von Helmstatt. Today a museum of the town is in there.
 The limes began near the city limit of Bad Hönningen. Today there is a museum called "Limes Center".
On July 15, 2005 the UNESCO made this area a World Heritage Site.
 The Schlossberg of Bad Hönningen is the biggest vineyard in Middle Rhine (9 hectare).

Tourism
.
Tourism is the main branch of the economy.

Because of its beautiful landscape, several cycling and hiking paths (such as Rheinsteig) go through Bad Hönningen.

In the summer times you can visit the town during a trip with one of the distinctive white ships which travel the Rhine.

The town also organizes many events such as funfair and several festivals.

Personality

Born in Bad Hönningen
 August Schoop (1858-1932), historian
 Karl-Heinz Thielen (born 1940 in Ariendorf district), football player

Connected to Bad Hönningen
 Willi Fischer (1920-1991), politician; 1958-1963 official mayor in Bad Hönningen
 Hermann Ilaender (born 1933), politician, civil servant and forestry association official, 1983-1999 mayor of the municipality
 Heinz Schwarz (born 1928 in Leubsdorf) former interior minister of Rhineland-Palatinate

References

External links
 Homepage Bad Hönningen

Neuwied (district)
Spa towns in Germany